Goodsoil Airport  is located  north-northwest of the village of Goodsoil, Saskatchewan, Canada, just south of Meadow Lake Provincial Park. It is on Highway 954, near the junction with Highways 26 and 224.

See also
List of airports in Saskatchewan

References

Registered aerodromes in Saskatchewan
Beaver River No. 622, Saskatchewan